Highway 692 is a highway in the Canadian province of Saskatchewan. It runs from Highway 55 near Choiceland to Highway 106.

Highway 6's northern terminus is at Highway 692 in Choiceland.

See also 
Roads in Saskatchewan
Transportation in Saskatchewan

References 

692